In enzymology, (S)-mandelate dehydrogenase (MDH),  is an enzyme that catalyzes the chemical reaction.

Thus, the two substrates of this enzyme are (S)-2-hydroxy-2-phenylacetate and acceptor, whereas its two products are 2-oxo-2-phenylacetate and reduced acceptor.

This enzyme belongs to the family of oxidoreductases, specifically those acting on the CH-OH group of donor with other acceptors.
The systematic name of this enzyme class is (S)-2-hydroxy-2-phenylacetate:acceptor 2-oxidoreductase. 

This enzyme transfers the electron pair from FMNH2 to a component of the electron transport chain, most probably ubiquinone [1,2]. It is part of a metabolic pathway in Pseudomonads that allows these
organisms to utilize mandelic acid, derivatized from the common soil metabolite amygdalin, as the sole source of carbon and energy. The enzyme has a large active-site pocket and preferentially binds
substrates with longer sidechains, e.g. 2-hydroxyoctanoate rather than 2-hydroxybutyrate. It also prefers substrates that, like (S)-mandelate, have beta unsaturation, e.g. (indol-3-yl)glycolate compared with
(indol-3-yl)lactate. Esters of mandelate, such as methyl (S)-mandelate, are also substrates.

Synonyms 
(S)-mandelate dehydrogenase is also knows as: L-mandelate dehydrogenase, L-MDH, MDH, SManDH, and SMDH.

References

 
 
 

EC 1.1.99
Enzymes of unknown structure